Jharkhand, a state of India, has twenty-four administrative districts.

Administration
A district of an Indian state is an administrative geographical unit, headed by a district magistrate or a deputy commissioner, an officer belonging to the Indian Administrative Service. The district magistrate or the deputy commissioner is assisted by a number of officials belonging to different wings of the administrative services of the state.

A superintendent of Police, an officer belonging to Indian Police Service is entrusted with the responsibility of maintaining law and order and related issues.

History
At the time of formation, Jharkhand state had 18 districts. Later, six more districts were carved out by reorganizing these districts. The 23rd and 24th districts- Khunti and Ramgarh (carved out of erstwhile Ranchi and Hazaribagh District respectively) were made a district on 12 September 2007.

Administrative Divisions and District

There are 24 districts of Jharkhand, which are grouped in to 5 divisions. These divisions are:
 Palamu division - 3 Districts: Palamu, Garhwa, Latehar - Headquarters: Medininagar
 North Chotanagpur division - 7 Districts: Chatra, Hazaribagh, Koderma, Giridih, Ramgarh, Bokaro, Dhanbad - Headquarters: Hazaribagh
 South Chotanagpur division - 5 Districts: Lohardaga, Gumla, Simdega, Ranchi, Khunti - Headquarters: Ranchi
 Kolhan division - 3 Districts: West Singhbhum, Saraikela Kharsawan, East Singhbhum - Headquarters: Chaibasa
 Santhal Pargana division - 6 Districts: Jamtara, Deoghar, Dumka, Pakur, Godda, Sahebganj - Headquarters: Dumka
Below is the list of districts:

See also

 Administrative divisions of Jharkhand
 Jharkhand

Notes and references

External links

Travel guide to Jharkhand's districts
Jharkhand State Government Official website

 
Districts
Jharkhand